The Gerschenkron effect, developed by Alexander Gerschenkron, claims that changing the base year for an index determines the growth rate of the index.  This effect is applicable only to aggregation method using reference price structure (meaning, each country’s quantities are valued by uniform set of prices to obtain volume) or reference volume structure (meaning, obtaining Purchasing power parity via valuation of uniform set of quantities by each country’s price). However, if production is measured by "real" tearms, this effect does not exist. 

This description is from the OECD website:

Simply, put the “Gerschenkron effect” measures the difference between Paasche and Laspeyres indices. That means that “early-weighted” aggregate will grow faster that “late-weighted.” Negative correlation is due to relatively rapid technical progress and falling relative price benefit from cost-reducing substitution. Or it can be vice versa; slow technical progress, increasing relative price suffer from cost-reducing substitution. In other words, this effect arises when activities whose relative prices are falling tend to increase their volume shares of total production and vice versa. Which is exactly what happened during industrial revolution when manufacturing expanded is produced volume. 

After revision by Jonas and Sardy in 1970, properties of the Gerschenkron effect were further developed. In addition to originally stated upward bias of base-year indices and reasoning behind that, it was shown that the movement in relative quantities is usually larger than the movement in relative prices and that the weighted correlation of those effects decreases over time with further development.

History 
What is now called the “Gerschenkron effect” have first appeared in 1947 and was further explained and used in a study A Dollar Index of Soviet Machinery Output in 1951 by Alexander Gerschenkron. Using actual data of United States machinery output in different years, it, empirically, showed that the substantial economic growth of the Soviet Union was due to index number bias; a Laspeyres index calculated on basis of 1926-27 had overstated the real expansion. It was shown for an industrial production index, however, it would be the same for price indices with differently weighted volume indices. That finding proved Soviet economic growth in the first half of 20th century to be subject to inappropriate technique, rather than false statistics. Which had a great political importance at that time as it deflated the economic growth of the biggest communist economy at that time. 

The “Gerschenkron effect” can be observed throughout the history. It is, however, connected with technological growth; e.g. industrial revolution. Because of tremendous technological development, thus, disproportional change in prices for different goods, the “Gerschenkron effect” has become even more pronounced in the second half of 20th century. Meaning, that the true economic growth was massively overstated if older prices were taken as base of the index. Therefore, both cross-country and cross-time comparisons has become rather challenging. Consider concurrent economic growth, especially of high-tech companies, the challenge will become greater.  

Specifically, for the example above, the Soviet Union to U. S. GDP ratio measured in U. S. prices will always be higher than if measured at Soviet prices and vice versa for U. S. to Soviet Union GDP ratio. Thus, it makes a loophole to be used for successful propaganda at both sides of the battlefield (e.g. during Cold War). However, for cross-time, within country, comparisons in centrally planned economic systems (e. g. in Soviet Union)), the “Gerschenkron effect” is practically non-existentsince prices are heavily distorted to provide an optimal resource allocation.  But it can still be observed while comparing two different economies.

Concerns 

From economics perspective, however, the “Gerschenkron effect” is said to be only a bad measurement, instead of aggregation or “index-number” problem. Since it is more appropriate to measure economic growth rate by “real terms” while comparing different countries. Thus, it eliminates problems connected with inflation, such as the “Gerschenkron effect.” However, most effect on the bias, thus, Gerschenkron effect, have early changes in the specific example examined by Alexander Gerschenkron. 

There is not one opinion when the “Gerschenkron effect” should be used or even whether it is even working. According to Larsen and Nilson, the “Gerschenkron effect” should be considered only in period of transitioning from handcrafting to mechanized industries. However, Jonas Ljunberg argues that it can be generalized since structural change is characterized by disproportional change in prices of different goods and/or capacities of various production. Therefore, “Gerschenkron effect” is pronounced in either  industrial development or total commodity production. 

It is also argued that the time period examined by Alexander Gerschenkron made this effect more pronounced than different would. It was due to a special conditions in the United States of America. If the time period would be extended to the beginning of the Second World War, i.e. 1939, the effect of growth would be reversed due to a depression. Because of artificial maintaining of prices of highly fabricated goods due to output restriction. On the other hand, output of simple goods was still relatively high, however, the prices fell down.

Applications 
The “Gerschenkron effect” is often used to test relative rates of technical change; simply said, “early-weighted” indices of production are “upward-biased” (overstating the true economic growth rate) and “late-weighted” indices of production are “downward-biased.” 

The “Gerschenkron effect” can be used for either long-term or short-term analysis and at various levels of economy. (Even though, it was not hugely pronounced in period from 1860s to 1970s due to rapid increase in relative prices and usual technological development which leads to change in relative quantity of goods produced). 

This effect was shown to be the major factor in overstating economic growth of Soviet Union in 20th century  and in the development of Sweden’s commodity production from the period of break-through to the high tide of industrialism.  We can observe that the main period of transformation was in two decades at the beginning of 20th century and then again during 1940s.  

It was mentioned that there is possibility to indicate the speed of the economic development in a society by the number bias of the index. Which is product of the Gerschenkron effect. However, it could add to an unbalanced industrialization period. It is because of the quantity relatives dominates, thus, Laspeyres quantity index goes up.

Different methodology 

Different method of examining growth over time could be comparing Paasche price index with annual quantity weight with Laspeyres price index with constant quantity weights from the start of the period. If there was an economic transformation, it would lead to fall of relative prices of new goods and its increasing share of the aggregate output. That would lead to lower values provided by PPI than LPI. Because while weights in LPI remain constant, in PPI relatively cheaper goods get increasing weight. According to Gerschenkron, this leads to “annoying index problem.” However, we can take ratio of PPI/LPI which has been labelled Gerschenkron effect. The more it decreases, the more economic transformation took place. 

Therefore, we can have two sorts of transformations: positive and negative. Corresponding to Schumpeter’s “creative destruction:” meaning that new industries expand at the expense of the older ones which are falling behind.

Weak and Strong Gerschenkron effect 
The “Gerschenkron effect” is further distinguished to weak and strong “Gerschenkron effect,” demonstrated on a topic of economic integration (in Central and Eastern European countries).
Observing higher productivity growth in industry contemporaneous output gap is the weak “Gerschenkron effect.” Which propel economic convergence, however, that occurs only in theoretical perspective in which the aggregate level is taken in account. On the other hand, if disaggregated (industrial) level is considered, that effect has important implication for the dynamics of comparative advantage.
If the catching-up parameter is higher in the industry with higher productivity gap, it is called the strong “Gerschenkron effect”. 
In practice, the weak “Gerschenkron effect” is common across all Central and Eastern European countries, and industries, however, the strong “Gerschenkron effect” holds only for specific industries in specific countries, specifically, for low tech and resource intensive industries.

References 

Economics effects
Index numbers